The meridian 49° west of Greenwich is a line of longitude that extends from the North Pole across the Arctic Ocean, Greenland, the Atlantic Ocean, South America, the Southern Ocean, and Antarctica to the South Pole.

The 49th meridian west forms a great circle with the 131st meridian east.

From Pole to Pole
Starting at the North Pole and heading south to the South Pole, the 49th meridian west passes through:

{| class="wikitable plainrowheaders"
! scope="col" width="120" | Co-ordinates
! scope="col" | Country, territory or sea
! scope="col" | Notes
|-
| style="background:#b0e0e6;" | 
! scope="row" style="background:#b0e0e6;" | Arctic Ocean
| style="background:#b0e0e6;" |
|-
| style="background:#b0e0e6;" | 
! scope="row" style="background:#b0e0e6;" | Lincoln Sea
| style="background:#b0e0e6;" |
|-
| 
! scope="row" | 
|Wulff Land
|-
| style="background:#b0e0e6;" | 
! scope="row" style="background:#b0e0e6;" | Atlantic Ocean
| style="background:#b0e0e6;" |
|-valign="top"
| 
! scope="row" | 
| Pará — Marajó island and the mainland Tocantins — from  Goiás — from  Minas Gerais — from  São Paulo — from  Paraná — from  Santa Catarina — from 
|-
| style="background:#b0e0e6;" | 
! scope="row" style="background:#b0e0e6;" | Atlantic Ocean
| style="background:#b0e0e6;" |
|-
| style="background:#b0e0e6;" | 
! scope="row" style="background:#b0e0e6;" | Southern Ocean
| style="background:#b0e0e6;" |
|-valign="top"
| 
! scope="row" | Antarctica
|-
|}

See also
48th meridian west
50th meridian west

w049 meridian west